, born 2 July 1940 in Xinjing, Manchukuo (now Changchun, Jilin, China), is a Japanese actress. She won the Medal with Purple Ribbon (2002) and Order of the Rising Sun, 4th Class, Gold Rays with Rosette (2011). She married actor Koji Ishizaka in 1971 after appearing in the same TV drama. They separated in an amicable divorce in 2000 after a nearly 30-year marriage due to Ishizaka’s desire to care for his aging mother. Asaoka made her acting debut in 1955 and has appeared in many Films and TV shows including Goyokin, Machibuse and the television series Zatoichi with Shintaro Katsu. In recent years, she has mainly worked on stage in addition to the occasional television appearance.

Filmography

Film
 Midori haruka ni (1955)
 Zesshō (1958)
 The Wandering Guitarist (1959)
 Kenju burai-chō Nukiuchino Ryu (1960)
 Danger Pays (1962)
 Alone Across the Pacific (1963)
 Red Handkerchief (1964)
 Thirst for Love (1967)
 Yogiri yo Kon'yamo Arigatō (1967)
 Goyokin (1969)
 Machibuse (1970)
 Senso to Ningen (1970)
 To Love Again (1971)
 Senso to Ningen II: Ai to Kanashimino Sanga (1972)
 Kage Gari (1972)
 Senso to Ningen III: Kanketsuhen (1973)
 Otoko wa Tsurai yo series (1973–2019) – Lily
 The Professor's Beloved Equation (2006)

Television
 Sexy Voice and Robo (2007) – Maki Makyouna
 Yasuragi no Sato (2017) – Saeko
 Naotora: The Lady Warlord (2017) – Jukeini

Honours
Kinuyo Tanaka Award (1995)
Medal with Purple Ribbon (2002)
Order of the Rising Sun, 4th Class, Gold Rays with Rosette (2011)

References

External links
Asaoka Ruriko's profile page

Discography of Ruriko Asaoka

1940 births
Living people
Japanese film actresses
Japanese television actresses
Japanese people from Manchukuo
Recipients of the Medal with Purple Ribbon
Recipients of the Order of the Rising Sun, 4th class
20th-century Japanese actresses
21st-century Japanese actresses